Lithophane antennata, known generally as the ashen pinion or green fruitworm, is a species of cutworm or dart moth in the family Noctuidae. It is found in North America.

The MONA or Hodges number for Lithophane antennata is 9910.

References

Further reading

External links

 

antenna
Articles created by Qbugbot
Moths described in 1858